The Oroquieta–Calamba Mountain Road is a , national secondary road in Misamis Occidental, Philippines. The entire road is designated as National Route 960 (N960) of the Philippine highway network.

References 

Roads in Misamis Occidental